Hershey Gardens is a  botanical garden and arboretum located at 170 Hotel Road, Hershey, near Harrisburg, Pennsylvania. They are set atop a hill overlooking Hersheypark. It was built as a gift from chocolate magnate Milton S. Hershey for his community and to honor his wife, Catherine.

Overview 

The garden occupies more than 20 acres just south of the Hotel Hershey. The botanical park was established in 1936 upon instructions of Milton S. Hershey, being opened to the public in June 1937 with a display consisting solely of 7,000 roses arranged in formal beds. Over the years, Hershey Gardens has grown into a 5 themed garden areas, with a rose-specific area that includes nearly 14,000 roses and some 800 varieties.

See also 
 List of botanical gardens in the United States

Further reading
 
 
 Smart Talk Road Trip: The Milton & Catherine Hershey Conservatory at Hershey Gardens, WITF-FM, Harrisburg, Pennsylvania, February 6, 2017. Includes audio from radio broadcast (19:51).

References

External links

 
 Hershey Community Archives on the Hershey Gardens

g
Hershey, Pennsylvania
Arboreta in Pennsylvania
Botanical gardens in Pennsylvania
Parks in Dauphin County, Pennsylvania
1937 establishments in Pennsylvania